Ellenhall is a small Staffordshire village roughly 2.5 miles south of Eccleshall originally comprising part of the extensive estates of the Earl of Lichfield. The population as taken at the 2011 census was 144. The village consists of a scattered community of cottages, a hall, and several farms. Ellenhall has no shop, public house or post office.

The village church stands on a natural mound close to the highest point at the northern end of the village and is dedicated to St. Mary. The grey sandstone chancel is the oldest part of the church dating from the 12th century, while the red-brick nave and tower represent a 1757 re-build of an earlier structure. The architect for the restoration was Andrew Capper.

The registers of St Mary, Ellenhall, commenced in 1539. The original registers for the period 1599-1903 (Baptisms), 1563-1754 & 1813-1836 (Marriages) & 1539-1964 (Burials) are deposited at Staffordshire Record Office. Bishops Transcripts for the period 1673-1866 (with gaps) are deposited at Lichfield Record Office.

Notable people 
 Robert Harcourt (1574 in Ellenhall – 1631) an English explorer, particularly of Guiana.

See also
Listed buildings in Ellenhall

References

External links

Borough of Stafford
Villages in Staffordshire